Gavril Stoyanov (9 July 1929 – 6 November 2005) was a Bulgarian football player and coach. He usually played in the position of midfielder.

Honours

International
Bulgaria
Olympic Bronze Medal: 1956

References

External links
 Player Profile at hebarfc.com

1929 births
2005 deaths
Footballers from Sofia
Bulgarian footballers
Bulgaria international footballers
Bulgarian football managers
FC Septemvri Sofia players
PFC CSKA Sofia players
First Professional Football League (Bulgaria) players
Footballers at the 1956 Summer Olympics
Olympic footballers of Bulgaria
Olympic bronze medalists for Bulgaria
Olympic medalists in football
Medalists at the 1956 Summer Olympics
Association football midfielders